Fist of Fury III is a martial arts Bruceploitation sequel.  It was originally released in Hong Kong as Jie quan yingzhua gong (literal: Jeet Kune the Claws and the Supreme Kung Fu), and has been informally called Chinese Connection III.  It continues the story of Chen Shen (Bruce Li) from Fist of Fury II, the brother of the Bruce Lee character in Fist of Fury.

Plot
After avenging the death of his brother, Chen Shen (Bruce Li) returns home from Shanghai. He tells his mother (who went blind from crying over her son's death) that he will no longer fight. Japanese occupiers who are aware of Chen's history terrorize his family by, among other things, vandalizing his mother's store and beating up his brother. Later, they frame Chen for a murder. After the Japanese boss arrives in town and causes a ruckus, Chen breaks out of jail for a final confrontation.

Reception
Critical reception was mixed.

Eric Reifschneider of Blood Brothers gave the film 2/5 and said: "I found this third entry worth a watch but overall it was just rather uninteresting. Perhaps with better filmmakers would this have been a rousing martial arts movie but as is it just left me a little hallow inside. Like usual with these post-Bruce Lee Bruceploitation films we get graced with an ultra shitty DVD of it in America. This DVD makes my DVDS for Chinese Connection 2 and Exit the Dragon look like Criterion releases! The film has horrible compression artifacts and the audio transfer that has high pitched cracking whenever a character talks. Perhaps with an actual good transfer of the film I would have enjoyed it more but for now I'm stuck with this shit DVD. Ironically the film is in a double feature with New Fist of Fury, that "other" sequel to Fist of Fury starring Jackie Chan."

Trivia
 The on-screen title of the English-dubbed version released in North America cropped for television and home is simply The Fist of Fury or in some cases Fist of Fury II. The numerals have been partially or completely cropped off. This has led to VHS releases that identify the film as Fist of Fury II by mistake.
 IMDB credits Lee Tso Nam as the director, while the Hong Kong Movie Database credits Do Liu-Boh.

References

External links 
 

1979 films
1979 martial arts films
Hong Kong action films
1979 action films
Bruceploitation films
Kung fu films
Hong Kong martial arts films
Hong Kong sequel films
1970s Hong Kong films
1980s Hong Kong films